Sultan Pur Noon is a small town of Union Council Purana Bhalwal  situated in Bhalwal, Sargodha District, in  Punjab, Pakistan.

References

Purana Bhalwal

Union councils of Sargodha District